Gongsun Sheng is a fictional character in Water Margin, one of the Four Great Classical Novels in Chinese literature. Nicknamed "Dragon in the Clouds", he ranks fourth among the 36 Heavenly Spirits, the first third of the 108 Stars of Destiny.

Background
The novel depicts Gongsun Sheng as an eight chi tall Taoist priest with a noble look as his eyebrows slant apart like the Chinese character for "eight" (八) and his eyes are almond-shaped. A native of Jizhou (薊州; present-day Ji County, Tianjin), he is a master of Taoist magic who could summon the wind and the rain, ride the mist and drive the clouds. His magical craft plus his sometimes mystical behaviour earn him the nickname "Dragon in the Clouds". He carries an ancient sword made of copper which is part of his magic kit.

Robbing the convoy of birthday gifts
Gongsun Sheng learns that Liang Shijie, the prefect of Daming, is sending valuables to his father-in-law Grand Tutor Cai Jing in the capital Dongjing as birthday gift. He rushes to Dongxi Village in Yuncheng County to ask Chao Gai, the village's headman famed for chivalry, to partner him to rob the convoy. However, Chao has already gathered Wu Yong, Liu Tang and the three Ruan brothers to plan for the hijack. Gongsun makes a row outside Chao's house when he is denied entry. Chao comes out to personally admit him and is pleased that he harbours the same design. 

Following Wu Yong's plan, the seven men, disguised as date traders, trick the escorts of the convoy led by Yang Zhi to drink spiked wine at the Yellow Mud Ridge. They cart away the valuables when the guards fall over feeling numb in their limbs.

The authorities later determine that Chao is the mastermind and send constables to arrest the group in his house. Forewarned by Song Jiang, Chao Gai, Wu Yong, Gongsun Sheng and Liu Tang flee to the home of the Ruan brothers in a fishing village. When constables come for them in a bigger force, Wu Yong sets a plan to lure them into the marsh. Gongsun plays the role of manipulating the weather to confound the pursuers, who lose their way in the lake and are mown down by the rest. After this, the seven men flee to Liangshan Marsh to seek refuge.

At Liangshan, Chao Gai replaces the narrow-minded Wang Lun as chief, who is killed by Lin Chong. Gongsun Sheng takes the third position after Chao Gai and Wu Yong.

At Liangshan
After some time at Liangshan, Gongsun Sheng misses his mother in Jizhou, who lives alone, and decides to go visit her. However, his stay with his mother stretches on as he continues his study of Taoism with his master Taoist Luo.

The Liangshan outlaws get into a battle with Gaotangzhou (高唐州; around present-day Gaotang County, Shandong) in their attempt to rescue Chai Jin, who is jailed by the prefecture's governor Gao Lian. Although Gao's force is no match for Liangshan, he uses black magic to conjure wild beasts to throw them into disarray. Distraught, Song Jiang sends Dai Zong to go fetch Gongsun to take on Gao. Li Kui insists on going along. After they found Gongsun in Jizhou, they could not win Taoist Luo's consent to let his disciple go. Exasperated, Li Kui steals into Taoist Luo's sanctum after nightfall and chops off his head. He is surprised to find the priest still alive the next day. Taoist Luo punishes Li by sweeping him to a magistrate office with a squall, where he is believed to be a demon from the sky and jailed. After taking back Li, Taoist Luo gives Gongsun Sheng permission to leave, but on the condition that he must return one day to complete his training. Gongsun defeats Gao Lian with his superior magic, following which Gaotangzhou falls and Chai Jin is rescued.

Liangshan is challenged by the outlaw band of Mount Mangdang (芒碭山; north of present-day Yongcheng, Henan) led by Fan Rui, Xiang Chong and Li Gun. Xiang and Li defeat Shi Jin, who is sent as the vanguard. Song Jiang arrives with the main force, which includes Gongsun Sheng. Gongsun arrays the Liangshan troops in a formation that traps Xiang and Li when they charge into it. Fan Rui, who has used his sorcery to aid the duo in their attack with strong winds and flying pebbles, could not extricate them. Gongsun also engulfs Xiang and Li in darkness causing them to fall into a pit. The two surrender moved by Song's warm treatment. They also persuade Fan to lay down his arms. In admiration of Gongsun's august magic power, Fan requests to be his apprentice to study sorcery and Taoism.

Campaigns

Gongsun Sheng is appointed as one of the two top strategists of Liangshan alongside Wu Yong after the 108 Stars of Destiny came together in what is called the Grand Assembly. He participates in the campaigns against the Liao invaders and rebel forces in Song territory following amnesty from Emperor Huizong for Liangshan.

In the expedition against Tian Hu, Gongsun Sheng seals the fall of the rebel leader when he defeats his magician Qiao Daoqing. After Liangshan put down the revolt of Wang Qing and before the campaign against Fang La starts, Gongsun requests to return to Jizhou to continue his study of Taoism under Taoist Luo. Seeing that he has made up his mind, Song Jiang lets him go. Gongsun spends the rest of his life pursuing the Taoist path in Jizhou. Fan Rui and Zhu Wu join him after Liangshan annihilated Fang La.

References
 
 
 
 
 
 
 

36 Heavenly Spirits
Fictional characters who use magic
Fictional characters from Tianjin